The Dogs (Protection of Livestock) Act of 1953 is a British Act devised to protect livestock from dogs. The Act outlines punishment of dog owners whose dogs worry livestock on agricultural land. Protected livestock is defined as cattle, sheep, goats, swine, horses and domestic poultry. Game birds are specifically excluded.

Potential repeal in 2021
The proposed Animal Welfare (Kept Animals) Bill would repeal the Dogs Act 1953.

See also
Dogs Act

References

External links

Dog law in the United Kingdom
United Kingdom Acts of Parliament 1953
Animal welfare and rights legislation in the United Kingdom